Hendrik Maarten "Henk" van Gent (born 10 May 1951 in Rotterdam) is a sailor from the Netherlands. A physical education teacher by training, he runs a sailing school in Rotterdam.

When the Netherlands boycotted the 1980 Moscow Olympic Games, he represented his National Olympic Committee at the 1980 Summer Olympics in Tallinn, USSR under the Dutch NOC flag. With Jan Willem van den Hondel as crew, he took 4th place in the 470.

Sources

External links
 
 
 

1951 births
Living people
Dutch male sailors (sport)
Olympic sailors of the Netherlands
Sailors at the 1980 Summer Olympics – 470
Sportspeople from Rotterdam